You're the Only Dancer is an LP album by Jackie DeShannon, released by Amherst Records as catalog number AMH-1010 in 1977.

Track listing

Personnel
 Ben Benay - harmonica, acoustic guitar
 Ken Benay - guitar
 Michael Bowden - bass
 Buzz Buchanan - drums, percussion
 Randy Edelman - piano, backing vocals
 James Gadson - drums
 Jay Graydon - guitar
 John Leslie Hug - electric guitar 
 David Hungate - bass
 Tricia Johns - backing vocals
 Kevin Kelly - organ
 Rick Littlefield - acoustic guitar
 J. D. Maness - steel guitar
 Charles Merriam - backing vocals
 Randy Mitchell - guitar
 Art Munson - guitar
 Jim Ed Norman - piano, electric piano
 David Paich - piano
 David Shields - bass
 Kathryn Ward - backing vocals
 John Ware - drums
 Brian Whitcomb - piano

1977 albums
Jackie DeShannon albums
Albums produced by Jim Ed Norman